Michael Robertson (born 2 July 1963) is a former South African-American, professional tennis player.

Robertson attended the University of Miami. He was the 1981 French Open Junior doubles winner (with Barry Moir). His best performance in Grand Slam events was Wimbledon 1986, semifinalist mixed  doubles (with Elna Reinach), US Open 1986 quarterfinalist men's doubles (with Tomm Warneke) and 1985 Australian Open quarterfinalist men's doubles (with John Letts).

Career finals

Doubles (1 runner-up)

References

External links
 
 

1963 births
Living people
American male tennis players
French Open junior champions
Miami Hurricanes men's tennis players
Tennis players from Johannesburg
Tennis players from Miami
South African emigrants to the United States
South African male tennis players
Grand Slam (tennis) champions in boys' doubles